Mochlus vinciguerrae, also known commonly as Vinciguerra's writhing skink, is a species of lizard in the family Scincidae. The species is indigenous to East Africa and the Horn of Africa.

Etymology
The specific name, vinciguerrae, is in honor of Italian ichthyologist Decio Vinciguerra.

Geographic range
M. vinciguerrae is found in Ethiopia and Somalia.

Reproduction
M. vinciguerrae is viviparous.

References

Further reading
Lanza B, Carfi S (1968). "Gli Scincidi della Somalia (Reptilia, Squamata)". Monitore Zoologico Italiano (Nuova Serie) Supplemento 2: 207–260. (Mochlus vinciguerrae, new combination, p. 242). (in Italian).
Largen MJ, Spawls S (2010). Amphibians and Reptiles of Ethiopia and Eritrea. Frankfurt am Main: Edition Chimaira / Serpents Tale. 694 pp. . (Lygosoma vinciguerrae, p. 382).
Parker HW (1932). "The Lizards of British Somaliland". Proceedings of the Zoological Society of London 1932: 335–367. (Lygosoma vinciguerrae, new species, p. 361).
Smith MA (1937). "A Review of the Genus Lygosoma (Scincidae: Reptilia) and its Allies". Records of the Indian Museum 39 (3): 213–234. (Riopa vinciguerrae, new combination, p. 228).

Mochlus
Skinks of Africa
Reptiles of Ethiopia
Reptiles of Somalia
Reptiles described in 1932
Taxa named by Hampton Wildman Parker